Big store may refer to:

 Big store, an elaborate confidence trick: see List of confidence tricks
 The Big Store, 1941 Marx Bros film
The Big Store (1973 film), a 1973 French comedy film
 A large retail establishment, see Big-box store